Jón Ólafsson (born 21 June 1941) is an Icelandic athlete. He competed in the men's high jump at the 1964 Summer Olympics and the 1968 Summer Olympics.

References

1941 births
Living people
Athletes (track and field) at the 1964 Summer Olympics
Athletes (track and field) at the 1968 Summer Olympics
Jon Olafsson 
Jon Olafsson 
Place of birth missing (living people)